Mats Göran Nordgren (born 9 April 1955) is a Swedish former footballer who played as a midfielder and made 19 appearances for the Sweden national team.

Career
Nordgren made his debut for Sweden on 1 September 1978 in a UEFA Euro 1980 qualifying match against France, in which he scored the opening goal for Sweden in the 2–2 draw. He went on to make 19 appearances, scoring 3 goals, before making his last appearance on 10 September 1980 in a 1982 FIFA World Cup qualification match against Scotland, which finished as a 0–1 loss.

Career statistics

International
Appearances and goals by national team and year

International goals

References

External links
 
 
 
 Profile at DFB.de
 Profile at kicker.de

1955 births
Living people
People from Kristianstad Municipality
Swedish footballers
Sweden international footballers
Swedish expatriate footballers
Expatriate sportspeople in Germany
Expatriate footballers in Germany
Association football midfielders
Östers IF players
KSV Hessen Kassel players
Mjällby AIF players
Allsvenskan players
Superettan players
Ettan Fotboll players
2. Bundesliga players
Footballers from Skåne County